Sedm schodů k moci is a 2023 Czech television series broadcast by Prima televize. It is a political drama inspired by 2013 Czech political corruption scandal. It follows Anna Malá who rises from a waitress to a powerful background political player.

Cast
 Eva Podzimková as Anna Malá (inspired by Jana Nagyová-Nečasová)
 Jiří Vyorálek as Tomáš Vichr (inspired by Petr Nečas)
 Pavel Batěk as Karel Krčka
 Tomáš Měcháček
 Veronika Žilková
 Jana Krausová
 Michal Novotný
 Michal Dalecký
 Alžbeta Stanková

References

External links 
Official site
IMDB site
ČSFD site

Czech drama television series
Czech political television series
2023 Czech television series debuts
Prima televize original programming